Hamza Ghanchi (born 17 December 1994) is a Pakistani cricketer. He made his first-class debut for Karachi Whites in the 2013–14 Quaid-e-Azam Trophy on 5 December 2013. On 8 October 2016 in the 2016–17 Quaid-e-Azam Trophy match against National Bank of Pakistan, he scored a triple century in the first innings, finishing 300 not out. He became the third-youngest Pakistani cricketer to make a triple century in a first-class match. However, he only played in 19 first-class matches, the last one being in the 2017–18 season.

References

External links
 

1994 births
Living people
Pakistani cricketers
Karachi Whites cricketers
Cricketers from Karachi